I'm a Celebrity...Get Me Out of Here! is an Australian reality television series in which celebrity contestants live together in a jungle environment for a few weeks, with no luxuries or contact from the outside world. The celebrities have to complete Bushtucker Trials to earn food for camp, or else they must survive off of basic rations.

The first season premiered in 2015 and there have been five series filmed in total since then. The series is filmed in the Kruger National Park in South Africa. During each series, contestants are progressively eliminated on the basis of public voting, with the eventual winner being crowned either the King or Queen of the Jungle and winning $100,000 for their chosen charity.

Contestants
As of season 8, 110 celebrities have competed. In the show's history, only four celebrities have withdrawn or walked from the show (two in season 4, one in each of seasons 7 and 8), before being voted out. In total, there have been five Kings and three Queens of the Jungle. Shane Warne is the only contestant to have since died.

International versions

References

External links

  
Australian television-related lists
Lists of reality show participants